Rodica Mahu (born 18 July 1959, Orhei) is a journalist from the Republic of Moldova. She is the editor in chief of Jurnal de Chişinău.

On 10 April 2009, Rodica Mahu was kidnapped while sending information for the publications' website through the phone from behind the Government building; she was interrogated by the police and released after two hours. South East Europe Media Organisation was alarmed about the kidnapping.

Awards
 The "Golden Apple", the Top 10 Journalists Gala 2010.

References

External links 
 Journalist Rodica Mahu was kidnapped, say colleagues from Jurnal de Chisinau 
 Ziarul Ring din Bucuresti a premiat-o pe Rodica Mahu jurnalista retinuta in fata redactiei sale

Moldovan journalists
Moldovan women journalists
Jurnal Trust Media
Romanian people of Moldovan descent
Human rights abuses in Moldova
People from Orhei
Living people
1959 births